The Alfred Noble Prize is an award presented by the American Society of Civil Engineers, as the trustee of prize funds contributed by the combined engineering societies of the United States. It is awarded annually to a person not over the age of thirty-five for a technical paper of exceptional merit published in one of the journals of the participating societies.

Established in 1929 in honor of Alfred Noble (1844-1914), past president of the American Society of Civil Engineers, the prize was first awarded in 1931. There have been several notable winners of this prize, including Claude E. Shannon in 1939.

The prize has no connection to the Nobel Prize established by Alfred Nobel, with which it is often confused owing to the similarity of their names.


Recipients

See also
 List of engineering awards
 List of awards named after people

References

Awards of the American Society of Civil Engineers
1929 establishments in the United States
Awards established in 1929